North Kent Island is one of the uninhabited Queen Elizabeth Islands in the Canadian arctic islands in the Qikiqtaaluk Region of Nunavut, Canada. It is located in the Cardigan Strait between Devon Island's Colin Archer Peninsula and Ellesmere Island's Simmons Peninsula.

Geography
The  island's terrain is flat-topped and ice-capped, with steep cliffs.

Fauna
North Kent Island is a Canadian Important Bird Area (#NU052), and an International Biological Program site. Notable bird species include black guillemot, common eider, glaucous gull, and Thayer's gull.

Walrus, bearded seal, ringed seal, and narwhal frequent the area.

References

External links
 North Kent Island in the Atlas of Canada - Toporama; Natural Resources Canada

Islands of the Queen Elizabeth Islands
Uninhabited islands of Qikiqtaaluk Region
Important Bird Areas of Qikiqtaaluk Region
Important Bird Areas of Arctic islands
Seabird colonies